Glenridding is a village at the southern end of Ullswater, in the English Lake District. The village is popular with mountain walkers who can scale England's third-highest mountain, Helvellyn, and many other challenging peaks from there.

Etymology

The name Glenridding is generally agreed to be Cumbric in origin, with the first element being *glinn, 'valley', and the second being *redïn, 'ferns, bracken' (cf. Welsh glyn rhedyn), giving a meaning of 'valley overgrown with bracken'. First recorded as Glenredyn in around 1290, the name's present form is thought to have been influenced by the Middle English element ridding, 'clearing'.

Geography

Glenridding is in the civil parish of Patterdale.

On 6 December 2015, Storm Desmond caused extensive and devastating flooding to the village, with torrential rainfall and rivers bursting their banks. Four days later, more rainfall caused rivers to burst their banks once again, leading to even more flood damage to businesses and homes in the village. Following the floods the community set up a Flood Action Group who continue to work on recovery and resilience measures to reduce the risk of future flooding.

Community and culture

Each year, on Easter Monday, a duck race is organised by the local mountain rescue team to raise funds. The village also has a rich sporting history, particularly in the traditional Lakeland sport of Fell Running and each September the Helvellyn Triathlon is held at Jenkins' Field by the shores of Ullswater, at one time considered the toughest triathlon in the UK.

Amenities
The village has accommodation including two youth hostels and camping sites. Glenridding House provides luxury bed and breakfast accommodation. There is also a tourist information centre, Ullswater Information Centre.

Greenside Mine

Above the village is the site of the former Greenside Mine, once the largest lead mine in the Lake District. Lead ore was discovered in the 18th century and the site was mined from the second half of the 18th century until the mine closed in 1962. Without the mine, the houses and economy of Glenridding and the surrounding area would not have existed.

Ullswater Steamers
Glenridding is home to the Ullswater 'Steamers', a leisure boat trip company which operates five vessels from the pier at Glenridding. The company was founded to provide a transport link for goods from Glenridding to Pooley Bridge and onwards to Penrith.

Glenridding in popular culture
The village and surrounding area was used to film the TV drama series The Lakes, and has also featured in a scene in Coronation Street.

See also

Listed buildings in Patterdale

References

External links 

 Cumbria County History Trust: Patterdale with Hartsop (nb: provisional research only – see Talk page)
 Video of the Glenridding to Glencoyne Bay walk
 Glenridding Large Sunny Images
 Glenridding
 Lake District Walks - Glenridding
 Glenridding War Memorial Information
 Glenridding Community Flood Group Website

Villages in Cumbria
Patterdale